The 1999 U.S. Women's Open was the 54th U.S. Women's Open, held June 3–6 at Old Waverly Golf Club in West Point, Mississippi, northwest of Columbus.

In her twentieth attempt, Juli Inkster won the first of her two U.S. Women's Open titles, five strokes ahead of runner-up Sherri Turner. Inkster, 38, broke the under-par scoring record with a 272 (−16) and became the oldest champion since 1955. It was the fourth of her seven major championships; she also won the next major, the LPGA Championship, three weeks later.

The win was the first by an American at the championship in five years, and Inkster became the first since JoAnne Carner to win the U.S. Women's Amateur and the U.S. Women's Open. Carner won her amateur title in 1968 and Open titles in 1971 and 1976. Inkster won three consecutive amateur titles in 1980, 1981, and 1982; she won her second Open in 2002.

Grace Park set the amateur scoring record at 283 (−5) and turned professional shortly after.

Annika Sörenstam shot 146 (+2) and missed the cut by two strokes, the second and last time she failed to play the weekend in her fifteen appearances. She previously missed the cut in 1997, as the two-time defending champion (1995, 1996). Sörenstam won her third Open in 2006, the last of her ten major titles.

Course layout

Source:

Past champions in the field

Made the cut

Source:

Missed the cut

Source:

Round summaries

First round
Thursday, June 3, 1999
Friday, June 4, 1999

Source:

Second round
Friday, June 4, 1999

Source:

Third round
Saturday, June 5, 1999

Source:

Final round
Sunday, June 6, 1999

Source:

References

External links
U.S. Women's Open - past champions - 1999
ESPN.com - 1999 U.S. Women's Open

U.S. Women's Open
Golf in Mississippi
Sports competitions in Mississippi
U.S. Women's Open
U.S. Women's Open
U.S. Women's Open
U.S. Women's Open
Women's sports in Mississippi